Eugene Luis Francisco Iglesias Carrillo (3 December 1926 – 4 February 2023) was an American actor from Puerto Rico who was active mainly in 1950s and 1960s. In 1955, Iglesias appeared as Alfredo on the TV western Cheyenne in the episode "Border Showdown." 
He is most known for his roles in Harper, otherwise referred to as "The Moving Target" during its production period, (1966), Cowboy (1958), and The Naked Dawn (1955). Iglesias was mostly active as a film actor, but also appeared in television, including the series My Little Margie and Dragnet (1954).

Life and career
Iglesias was born in December 1926 in San Juan, Puerto Rico. He was also known as Gene Iglesias. He died from a heart attack on 4 February 2023, in Lamesa, Texas, at the age of 96.

Filmography

References

External links

1926 births
2023 deaths
American male actors
People from San Juan, Puerto Rico
Puerto Rican male actors